Pedrelli is an Italian surname. Notable people with the surname include:

Daniele Pedrelli (born 1988), Italian footballer
Ivan Pedrelli (born 1986), Italian footballer

See also
 Perelli
 Petrelli

Italian-language surnames
Surnames from given names